Dai Yongjiu (born November 1964) is a Chinese meteorologist and professor at Sun Yat-sen University.

Education
Dai was born in Wugang, Hunan in November 1964. In 1987 he graduated from Jilin University, earning a bachelor's degree in mechanics. In 1995 he obtained his doctor's degree from the Institute of Atmospheric Physics, Chinese Academy of Sciences (CAS). After graduation, he was a research associate there.

Career in the United States
He moved to the University of Arizona in August 1997 as an assistant research scientist and then to Georgia Institute of Technology as a research scientist in March 2000.

Career in China
Dai was a professor at Beijing Normal University between June 2002 and August 2016. He was dean of School of Geography, Beijing Normal University in 2004, and held that office until 2008. He joined Sun Yat-sen University in February 2016.

Honours and awards
 2002 National Science Fund for Distinguished Young Scholars
 2014 Science and Technology Award of the Ho Leung Ho Lee Foundation
 November 22, 2019 Member of the Chinese Academy of Sciences (CAS)

References

1964 births
Living people
People from Wugang, Hunan
Scientists from Hunan
Jilin University alumni
Chinese meteorologists
Academic staff of Beijing Normal University
Academic staff of Sun Yat-sen University
Members of the Chinese Academy of Sciences